Amaura may refer to :

 the Ancient city and bishopric Amourah, in present Algeria, now a Latin Catholic titular see
 the generation VI Pokémon character List of generation VI Pokémon#Amaura